Hard Truck 2: King of the Road is the European version of Hard Truck 2. It was released in various European countries by JoWooD Productions on June 7, 2002.

Gameplay
The game is an open world truck driving simulator, but less relaxing. You will be racing your competition for the monopoly of the trucking market. In doing so, you will have to race with your competition from destination to destination all while you have to evade the mafia, drive carefully enough so the police is content, dealing with any road hazards that exist and expanding your business.

Reception
In the United States, Hard Truck 2 sold 210,000 copies and earned $2.1 million by August 2006, after its release in June 2000. It was the country's 100th best-selling computer game during this period.

Footnotes

2002 video games
Trade simulation games
Truck racing video games
Video games developed in Russia
Video game sequels
Windows games
Windows-only games
JoWooD Entertainment games